is a Japanese speed skater.

Early life
She was born on 22 May 1984 in Sarabetsu, Hokkaido, Japan.

Career
Otsu competed in the 2006 Winter Olympics in Torino, in the Women's 1,500 metres, and the Women's Team Pursuit (6 laps).

References

External links

1984 births
Living people
Japanese female speed skaters
People from Hokkaido
Speed skaters at the 2006 Winter Olympics
Olympic speed skaters of Japan
Speed skaters at the 2007 Asian Winter Games